The Tertiary Education Quality and Standards Agency (TEQSA) is Australia's independent national quality assurance and regulatory agency for higher education.

The agency's purpose is to protect student interests and the reputation of Australia's higher education sector through a proportionate, risk-reflective approach to quality assurance that supports diversity, innovation and excellence.

All organisations that offer higher education qualifications (diploma or above) in or from Australia must be registered by TEQSA. Higher education providers that have not been granted self-accrediting authority must also have their courses of study accredited by the agency. Australian universities have self-accrediting authority and are not required to have their courses accredited by TEQSA.

The Australian higher education sector includes public and private universities, Australian branches of overseas universities, TAFEs, government agencies, professional bodies, faith-based colleges and other independent for-profit and not-for-profit providers.

Operational activities  
The Tertiary Education Quality and Standards Agency Act 2011 (TEQSA Act), calls the agency to:

 Register regulated entities as higher education providers and accredit their courses of study
 Assess the compliance of registered higher education providers with the Higher Education Standards Framework
 Provide advice and make recommendations to the Commonwealth Minister responsible for Education on matters relating to the quality and regulation of higher education providers
 Cooperate with similar agencies in other countries
 Collect, analyse, interpret and disseminate information relating to higher education providers, higher education awards, quality assurance practice and quality improvement in higher education.

Governance - TEQSA Commission 
The TEQSA Commissioners are appointed by the Commonwealth Minister for Education and are responsible for making major regulatory decisions, setting strategic directions, monitoring risk in the sector and deciding on matters relating to the development of the agency's quality assurance and regulatory functions. The Commissioners are TEQSA's accountable authority.

The Commissioners as of 20 August 2021 are Professor Peter Coaldrake AO (Chief Commissioner) and Emeritus Professor Joan Cooper.

The Chief Executive Officer and a team of Senior Managers oversees the work of the agency and supports the Commission.

TEQSA's Corporate Plan sets out the agency's activities and priorities, and performance is documented in the Annual Report.

Legal framework 
The Tertiary Education Quality and Standards Agency Act 2011 (TEQSA Act) calls for TEQSA to regulate higher education using a standards-based quality framework based on principles of regulatory necessity, reflecting risk and proportionate regulation.

The Higher Education Standards Framework (Threshold Standards) 2015 (HES Framework) applies to all higher education providers. They are the minimum level of achievement that a provider must meet and maintain to be registered to deliver higher education courses of study. TEQSA evaluates the performance of providers against the requirements of this Framework.

The Education Services for Overseas Students Act 2000 (ESOS Act) applies to providers offering higher education courses of study to students in Australia on student visas. TEQSA's responsibilities under the ESOS Act apply to:

 Higher education courses
 Foundation Programs (except those delivered by schools)
 English Language Intensive Courses for Overseas Students (ELICOS) programs delivered under an entry arrangement with a higher education provider.

The National Code of Practice for Providers of Education and Training to Overseas Students 2018 (National Code 2018) provides nationally consistent standards that protect international students. The National Code protects governs courses registered on the Commonwealth Register of Institutions and Courses for Overseas Students (CRICOS). Only CRICOS courses can be offered to international students studying in Australia on a student visa.

Additional information: Acts and Standards.

National Register of Higher Education providers 
TEQSA maintains an online public register, the National Register of all higher education providers and their accredited courses of study. The register is the authoritative source of information on the status of registered higher education providers in Australia.

Australian higher education sector 
All providers of higher education registered by TEQSA, through meeting the requirements of the Higher Education Standards Framework (Threshold Standards) 2015, become ‘higher education providers’. This title signals that the provider is a bona fide provider of quality higher education in Australia.

Higher education consists of awards spanning the Australian Qualifications Framework (AQF) levels 5-10, which include diplomas, advanced diplomas, associate degrees, bachelor's degrees (including honours), graduate certificates, graduate diplomas, master's degrees, doctoral degrees and higher doctoral degrees.

Approach to quality assurance and regulation 
The agency’s regulatory approach is guided by the following three regulatory principles: regulatory necessity, reflecting risk, proportionate regulation.

While the TEQSA Act establishes a broad framework for the agency's overall approach to higher education regulation, the core elements are to apply a ‘standards and risk-based quality’ framework to protecting and promoting the interests of higher education students and the reputation of Australia's higher education sector.

TEQSA released its first report on risk findings on Australia's higher education sector (July 2019).

TEQSA's approach to compliance and enforcement can be found in the publication, TEQSA's approach to compliance and enforcement.

Regulatory action commonly ranges (escalates) from TEQSA:

 Providing education and support, to
 Communication of concerns in writing, to
 Requesting information and reporting, to
 Imposing conditions on provider's registration and/or conditions on course accreditation, to
 Approving registration or accreditation for a period less than the full seven years, to 
 Cancelling registration.

History 
In 2008, the Australian Government initiated a Review of Australian Higher Education to examine and report on the future direction of the sector, its fitness for purpose in meeting the needs of the Australian community and economy, and options for reform.

This Review, also known as the Bradley Review, recommended a new, independent national regulatory body be responsible for all types of higher education. The review team decided that a national approach would provide a more effective, streamlined and integrated sector, achieving a sustainable and responsible higher education system.

The Australian Government responded to the Bradley Review in 2009, announcing a reform package for higher education. This package expanded the system and was intended to create new opportunities for all Australians to reach their potential in higher education.

The Government also committed to ensuring that growth in the sector was underpinned by a robust quality assurance and regulatory framework with an emphasis on student outcomes and the quality of the student experience.

TEQSA was established by the Government as Australia's higher education regulation and quality assurance agency in 2011, with a focus on ensuring that higher education providers meet minimum standards, promote best practice and improve the quality of the Australian higher education sector.  

In 2012, TEQSA assumed regulatory powers under the TEQSA and ESOS Acts. In 2013, following the expression of some concerns from providers about the burden of TEQSA's regulatory approach, the Review of Higher Education Regulation Report was released, and in 2014, a significantly streamlined Revised Risk Assessment Framework was adopted. The Higher Education Standards Framework was reviewed in 2015 and became effective in January 2017. The impact of the TEQSA Act was reviewed in 2016-17 and, in 2019, a bill to implement the recommendations of the review was introduced to the Australian Parliament.

In June 2020 the Australian Government announced a new Higher Education Integrity Unit would be established within TEQSA. The unit will identify and analyse emerging threats and assist the sector to address them, in areas such as academic and research integrity, cyber security, foreign interference and admission standards. The new unit commenced operations in January 2021.

Engagement 
TEQSA’s engagement is with all levels of the higher education sector – from current and prospective students, through to higher education providers, peak bodies and international quality assurance agencies. Student engagement activities are focused through the Student Expert Advisory Group.

As Australia's national quality assurance and regulatory agency for higher education, the agency is sometimes called on to address sector wide issues that affect students and, in turn, the wider Australian community. TEQSA also accepts complaints about Australian higher education providers to gather information that assists the agency in the regulation of the sector.

With responsibility for regulating all Australian higher education, whether offered in Australia or overseas, TEQSA has a network of agreements with the regulatory bodies of those countries in which Australian providers are most active.

TEQSA hosts an annual conference consisting of workshops, plenaries, Q&As, networking opportunities and keynote speakers. The 2021 conference is to be held online on 25 November, after the 2020 conference was cancelled due to the COVID pandemic.

Publications 
TEQSA provides various publications including reports and papers, frameworks, online e-News as well as guidance materials, for example:

 Good Practice Note: Making higher education admissions transparent
 Guidance Note: Academic Leadership
 Guidance Note: ELICOS Direct Entry
 Guidance Note: Technology Enhanced Learning
 Guidance Note: Financial Assessment

References

External links 
 

Higher education in Australia
Quality assurance
Higher education accreditation
Oversight and watchdog organizations
Educational organisations based in Australia
Commonwealth Government agencies of Australia
2011 establishments in Australia
Government agencies established in 2011
Regulatory authorities of Australia
Higher education regulators